Dicromantispa interrupta is a species of mantidfly in the family Mantispidae. It is found in Central America and North America. Larvae develop in the egg sacs of hunting spiders. Adults have spotted wings.

References

Further reading

External links

 

Hemerobiiformia
Articles created by Qbugbot
Insects described in 1825